Te Mārama was most likely a Māori woman possibly from a tribe (iwi) in northern New Zealand.

Te Mārama signed the Treaty of Waitangi on an unknown date, but it was probably in the Bay of Islands. She was one of a select few of Māori women who signed the treaty.

References

19th-century New Zealand women
New Zealand Māori women
Signatories of the Treaty of Waitangi
Year of birth missing
Year of death missing